LCC International University, formerly Lithuania Christian College (LCC), is a liberal arts institution in the city of Klaipėda, Lithuania, established in 1991
by a joint venture of Lithuanian, Canadian and American foundations.

Accreditations

The Republic of Lithuania recognizes LCC as a Bachelor's and master's degrees granting university. See full list of all accredited institutions in Lithuania (check the list of non-state higher education institutions for more details).

History 
At the invitation of the Ministry of Education and Culture, the Lithuania Christian Fund began the establishment of Lithuania Christian College in the summer of 1991 in Panevėžys. That summer the college began with classes in the English language at the first Summer Language Institute. During the fall and spring of 1991-1992, students studied English full-time in the English Language Institute. In August 1999, LCC moved to its current facilities in Klaipėda, a city along the Baltic coast in Lithuania. https://lcc.lt/about-lcc/lcc-history

Study Programs
Students at LCC International University enroll in six bachelor programs of study: International Business Administration, English Language and Literature, Psychology, Theology, Contemporary Communication and International Relations and Development. LCC also offers two Master of Arts (M.A.) degrees: Teaching English to Speakers of Other Languages (TESOL) and International Management program in partnership with Taylor University (Indiana, USA).

University Community
The current student enrollment is 781, 80% of whom are international students from 57 countries. Each semester about 35 Study Abroad students come to LCC from North American universities.
One-third of LCC faculty are Lithuanian while two-thirds are from Western Europe, Canada and the United States.

External links 

 University website

Universities in Lithuania
Educational institutions established in 1991
Education in Klaipėda
1991 establishments in Lithuania